Albanians in the United Kingdom include immigrants from Albania and ethnic Albanians from Kosovo.

History

Albanians in the United Kingdom were first mentioned as merchants and seamen on the coasts of England during the 14th and 15th centuries.

Albanian stradioti mercenaries during the 16th century served the English king in his wars against the Kingdom of Scotland.

The history of modern-day Albanians in the UK began in the early 20th century, when a small group of Albanians arrived in this country. Among them was one of the greatest Albanian intellectuals, Faik Konica, who moved to London and continued to publish the magazine Albania, which he had founded in Brussels. Shortly after World War II, there were about 100 Albanians in Britain.

The 1991 census recorded only 338 Albanians in England. In 1993, the figure had risen to 2,500. Many were young Kosovars who avoided recruiting into the Yugoslav Army, who had sought political asylum. In June 1996, a Supreme Court decision accepted that Kosovo Albanians were persecuted in the former Yugoslavia. This meant that all Kosovo Albanians should be granted residence permits in Britain. After this decision, Britain faced a huge and unexpected influx of Albanians from Kosovo, Albania, the Republic of Macedonia, Montenegro and Serbia. By the end of 1997, around 30,000 Albanians lived in Britain.

Many Albanians are reported to have moved to the UK by pretending to be Kosovans fleeing the Kosovo War.

In August 2022, it was reported that British government officials believed that Albanians made up 50 to 60% of irregular small boat migrant arrivals, with 1,727 Albanian arrivals recorded in May and June 2022 compared to only 898 between 2018 and 2021. In the first half of 2022, Albanians made up 18% of the recorded arrivals. In the second quarter of 2022, Albanians became the largest nationality group claiming asylum in the UK, with applications from 3,289 people. 53% of Albanian asylum seekers' claims were granted in an initial decision in the year to June 2022.

In October 2022, a committee of British Members of Parliament heard that so far that year over 12,000 people from Albania had entered the UK via small boat during the English Channel migrant crossings. An estimated 10,000 of which were adult men which represented around 'one to two percent' of the entire male population of Albania. The numbers were described as an 'exponential rise' as only 50 Albanians had arrived via this method in 2020 and 800 in 2021. The rise in numbers was blamed on Albanian criminal gangs gaining a foothold in northern France.

Demography
A mapping exercise published by the International Organization for Migration in September 2008 states that there were no official estimates of the total number of ethnic Albanians in the UK at the time. The majority of respondents interviewed for the exercise estimated the population to lie between 70,000 and 100,000.

The 2011 Census recorded 13,295 Albanian-born residents in England and 120 in Wales, The censuses of Scotland and Northern Ireland recorded 196 and 55 Albanian-born residents respectively. The census recorded 28,390 Kosovo-born residents (including people all ethnicities) in England and 56 in Wales. The censuses of Scotland and Northern Ireland recorded 215 and 44 Kosovo-born residents respectively. In 2019, the Office for National Statistics estimated that 47,000 people born in Albania and 29,000 people born in Kosovo were resident in the UK.

Social issues
Albanians are amongst the largest groups of irregular immigrants in the UK, and Albanian children are the second largest group receiving help from Barnardo's child trafficking support teams. In 2010, Albanians were not seen as a significantly at-risk group, but in 2015 Barnardo's estimated that Albanians accounted for a quarter of children allocated an advocate under its child trafficking support scheme. Some are forced to work, particularly on building sites, but the majority are exploited for criminal activities.

Albanians seeking asylum in the UK regularly cite blood feuds as the reason that it is unsafe for them to return to Albania. The number of Albanian asylum applicants rose from 173 in 2008 to 1,809 in 2015. The vast majority of these applications are rejected.

In June 2017, the National Crime Agency's annual report on organized crime warned that Albanian criminal gangs had "established a high-profile influence within UK organized crime", focusing mainly on the trafficking of cocaine to London. The report noted that "The threat faced from Albanian crime groups is significant. London is their primary hub, but they are established across the UK". It also noted that only 0.8% of organized criminals in the UK are Albanians, with British nationals accounting for 61.6% (23.5% are of unknown nationality). Albanian organized criminals display a readiness to use serious violence, which according to the National Crime Agency makes their impact more troubling, however.

Between April 2015 and April 2019, 6,200 Albanian nationals were deported from the UK to Albania. This was the highest number of any nationality over this period. Many of these deportees are reported to be from the counties of Shkodër, Kukës and Dibër, from where British-based drugs gangs recruit.

In 2020, Albanians were reportedly the largest foreign national group in UK prisons with over 1,500 inmates, representing roughly 10% of the foreign prison population in the UK, rising from 2% in 2013. In July 2021, British Home Secretary Priti Patel signed an agreement with the Albanian Government which would make it easier for the UK to return criminals and unsuccessful asylum seekers back to Albania. It was also reported that the UK could help fund the construction of a new prison in Albania to house offenders sent back from the UK.

Notable people

Academics
 Lea Ypi, political theorist

Arts and entertainment 
Rita Ora, British singer, songwriter and actress
Dua Lipa, English singer and songwriter
DJ Regard, musician

Journalists 
 Ilir Kadia, journalist
 Klentiana Mahmutaj, author and academic
 Adel Darwish, British political journalist, a veteran Fleet Street reporter, author, historian

Cinema 
 Orli Shuka, British-Albanian actor

Sport 
Alban Bunjaku, footballer
Olsi Krasniqi, rugby league player
Eder Kurti, boxer
Elvisi Dusha, Albanian-British basketball player
Zeli Ismail, footballer
Egli Kaja, footballer
Erjon Dollapi, Rugby League player
Lirak Hasani, English footballer
Kreshnik Qato, boxer
Florian Marku, boxer
Geraldo Bajrami, footballer
Jimmy Marku, strongman
Armando Dobra, footballer
Armando Broja, footballer
Anis Mehmeti, footballer
Florent Hoti, footballer
Adrion Pajaziti, footballer
Elizabeta Ejupi, footballer

See also 

Albania–United Kingdom relations
Kosovans in the United Kingdom

References

United Kingdom
European diaspora in the United Kingdom
 
Muslim communities in Europe